Due to various differences in cultural histories and environmental resources, West African nations developed glass traditions distinct from Egypt, North Africa and the rest of the world. The presence of glass in Sub-Saharan Africa mostly consists of the importation of glass beads shipped primarily from the Middle East and Indian as early as 200-300AD; later, from Portugal, the Netherlands, and Venice.

As most African cultures have long histories of crafting and adornment with beads made from wood, bone and shell, the introduction of glass as a bead material was widely and rapidly received. The exchange of glass beads for local goods such as ivory, gold and slaves aided in the accumulation of wealth and creation of unequal power dynamics still apparent today. Archaeological evidence, primarily from various burial sites from the West and coastal port cities in the East, confirm the import of hundreds of thousands of glass beads.4  3 These assemblages boast rich varieties in shape, colour, texture and patterning. While most Sub-Saharan glass was imported as pre-formed beads, there is evidence of the importation of glass fragments and ingots to be used in local beadmaking practices.5 Preliminary excavations also exhibit evidence of indigenous glass production from raw materials, a technology previously thought unknown to this region of the world.6 4, recent evidence has shown that glass making may been started separate from the general glass trade as early as the 1500s

Cultural and historical significance

Symbolism
As subsistence-level herding was common throughout much of Sub-Saharan Africa, bead adornment was an apt medium for self and cultural expression; whereas a more permanent art form would have proven impractical. Through various bead shape formations, colouring choices and assemblage methods, individuals were able to express complex information which was particularly useful in the absence of written language. Notions such as age, marital status and relative economic wealth were communicated through careful selection of symbolic glass beads. The remelting and reworking of existing beads also suggests that the shape and style of glass beads held specific cultural values; various regions were able to imitate more favourable foreign styles, create unique forms or produce much larger beads than what was available through international trade, effectively expressing local distinctiveness. 7 8 Glass beads also provided a means of connecting with ones ancestors. Known as Heirloom beads, these beads were typically translucent, resembling wax, having a discoid shape and usually could be dated back to the middle and late Iron Age. Whether strung as jewellery, attached to clothing or stored unassembled, Heirloom beads were extremely prized and often passed down from generation to generation. Additionally, glass beads have been linked to a number of religious and symbolic practices, primarily as offerings to deities at sacred locations and constructed shrines. 4

Beads as economic wealth
Glass beads in Sub-Saharan regions were used as an economic tool, denoting wealth and political power. Yoruba kings, or Obas, often encouraged complicated and abundant glass beadworking as a visual symbol of their nation's wealth. Production of beads in great quantities could also be offered by Obas to various deities as a symbol of appreciation of such granted political and economic power. Aje Ilekes, discs of melted cullet (recycled material) glass with beads embedded, were produced by intentionally destroying and remelting glass beads, serving as a status symbol of power and wealth. Aje Ilekes are still used today as a monetary system, often exchanged as wedding dowry.4 In the archaeological record it is common to find numerous glass beads and beadworking tools such as stone anvils and crucibles included in burial sites suggesting the objects’ cultural and economic importance.4

Importation and trade

Early chronology
Attempts to determine date and origin of glass beads found in Sub-Saharan Africa have been made with varying success. According to recent archeological research in Nigeria,  there is evidence that glass was locally produced in Igbo Olokun in the 11th-15th centuries A.D., (before European glass trade with West Africa). It is generally agreed that glass beads were present in the Sub-Saharan world by at least 300AD, some having been imported from the Middle East and South East Asian regions. Transported by sea, shipments arrived to coastal ports such as Mtwapa and Ungwana in Kenya and were then distributed inland via local trade networks and kinship relations.3 On land, glass bead cargos travelled through North Africa south to areas such as Gao in Mali, as well as Nigeria, Ghana and Benin. The expansion of the Roman Empire helped to broaden trade patterns and the introduction of the camel as means of transport significantly fostered the spread of imported goods. European nations entered the African trading market, beginning with Portugal, Italy and Bohemia in the 15th century, followed by the Dutch, English, French, Belgians and Germans. By the 17th century, the Netherlands managed to secure an impressive monopoly on the glass bead exchange with Sub-Saharan Africa. A Dutch merchant and entrepreneur named Sir Nicholas Crisp is recorded to have been awarded a patent “for the sole making and vending of beads and beugles to trade to Guinea,” in 1632.7

Trade wind beads
During the Medieval Period, trade of a particular style of glass bead, the Trade Wind bead, dominated the market. These beads ranged in colour and length but could be mass-produced.3 Termed “Trade Wind beads” due to the use of monsoon winds for navigation, these beads were shipped throughout the Indian Ocean Trading Complex, especially to East, West and South African coastal ports. 3 India and Sri Lanka contributed greatly to the exchange of Trade Wind beads though it has been disputed whether these countries also partook in the primary production of glass used for such beads. The mineral soda-alumina (abbreviated m-Na-Al or mNa) chemical composition of most Trade Wind Beads found in Sub-Saharan regions suggests a connection to the mineral-soda sources and alumina rich sand ubiquitous in India; however, there is no archaeological evidence to support this hypothesis to date.3 Other analysts propose a Middle Eastern, Venetian and/or Portuguese origin for the Trade Wind beads found in Sub-Saharan regions.

Slave beads

European nations became increasingly involved in the glass bead trade with Africa which consequently aided in the foreign exploitation of natural resources, including slaves. Because Westerners viewed Africans as “the uncivilised of the World,”7 glass beads known crudely as “slave beads” were commonly exchanged for human cargo which could then be shipped and traded for other desired goods. The residual effects from the glass bead trade had dramatically varying results across Sub-Saharan Africa. While most regions suffered economic and social hardship due to abusive foreign monopolies, some nations prospered from this interaction. Coastal ports serving as initial points of contact often benefited from access to imported goods, reaping profits from their own subsequent distribution to regions inland. Scholars have suggested that the rise of Empires in Ghana and Mali between the 8th-13th centuries, as well as the Kingdoms of Benin and Akan during the 16th century are intrinsically related to the access and distribution of foreign glass beads. 3 5

Bead manufacture

Glass manufacture: primary and secondary glass production
Primary glass production involves the combination of the raw materials Soda, Lime and Silica, heated at specific temperatures in order to produce a basic glass compound (see Glass and Anglo-Saxon Glass). Traditionally, glass has been made from either the mixture of ground quartz stones (providing the silica) and plant ash (supplying the soda and lime elements); or, by utilizing sand as a silica and lime source and then adding a chemical natron for the remaining soda needed. The production of primary glass has seen much variation throughout its history, each region slightly altering the chemical composition to better suit its particularly environmental and cultural needs (i.e. adding various fluxes/chemical additives in order to lower the required melting temperature). The addition of mineral deposits to alter the colour of glass can be carried out in the primary stage or can be added in later stages of production. The secondary production of glass typically involves processes of colouring, remelting, shaping and decorating of the glass object. While some archaeological evidence suggests the concurrence of both primary and secondary glass production at the same site, in the case of glass beads these processes often occurred separately. As access to premade glass and foreign colorants increased, beadmaking from imported goods developed into a technology which could be conducted in virtually any location across the globe.10

Beadworking

The production of beads from imported glass shards, cullet (scraps) and undesired glass beads has a lively presence in Sub-Saharan history. Imported glass was either formed by melting such imported glass, potentially adding desired colorants, and then shaping the melt into a bead form; or, by grinding down the imported glass to form a powder which would then be shaped, heated and cooled. The archaeological evidence of beadworking in Sub-Saharan Africa provides examples of both types.5 9

Wound glass beads
With melted glass working, beads found were generally formed by either a wound, drawn or moulded process. Wound glass beads, also known as Tubular, Cylindrical, Spherical or Melon-Shaped, were formed by folding molten glass around a metal rod called a mandrel. Once the glass had cooled slightly, the material was slipped off the mandrel and pinched and prodded until it reached a desired shape.9

Drawn glass beads
Also known as Cane beads, Drawn beads were formed by dipping an iron blowpipe into molten glass and slightly blowing air through the pipe, allowing for a “gather,” or hollow glass ball, to form at the end. A rod called a ‘puntil’ was used to pull the gather into a longer, hollow form which would then cool and be broken into individual beads. As glassblowing technology did not exist in early Sub-Saharan African regions, locally produced drawn beads were made by trapping air bubbles in molten glass and then drawing the glass into a cane form.8

Moulded glass beads
Little evidence of beads produced from moulds are found in Sub-Saharan Africa, however it is understood that beads of this form were produced by dropping molten glass into a preformed open clay mould and then “punched” with a core to take on the mould's form. Holes could then be drilled through moulded beads or, beads produced from half moulds could then be adhered together.9

Powder glass beads

The glass beads of Sub-Saharan Africa that were not melted from pre-existing glass material were instead formed by grinding glass into a fine powder to be worked further. Sources for such glass included scraps from broken glass bottles, cullets (recycled glass) or pre-existing glass beads which were no longer wanted. The grinding process generally caused colouring to be lost; therefore, various pigments were often added at this stage (see the colouring section below). After the desired colour was achieved, powdered glass was either worked in its dry form or was wetted with water or saliva to create a paste. This paste was next formed by hand into various bead shapes. Powder Glass Beads were then heated, allowed to cool and finally, polished.8 Garden Roller beads, such as the Bodom beads of Ghana.8 were the earliest form of powder glass beads found, made by threading glass in a mould with a mandrel. This process was extremely labour-intensive and expensive as the mould used was unable to be reused.8 More common were the Kiffa beads, typically associated with Mauritania. These beads were produced from the wet-form of powder glass production, and have been found since the 8th century. The paste produced in wet-form production was shaped into a bead using frames typically made of leaves of grass and then were decorated and coloured using a needle.8

Lapidary beads
Though technically made from glass, the lapidary style of bead production is more akin to stone working than proper glass manufacturing. This process involved the recycling of imported glass by chipping, knapping, drilling and polishing pieces to a desired bead form. Evidence from areas outside of Ile-Ife, Nigeria suggests that individuals scavenged for discarded glass remains from earlier burial sites at Olokun Grove. Glass remains that had been brought to the upper soil layers (either naturally or via “mining”) were collected and worked to produce new glass beads.4

Colouring
Colouring of glass could either be achieved by adding bits of pre-existing coloured glass, such as bottle shards or beads, by adding scrap metals, or by adding mineral pigments directly.9 The beads found in Sub-Saharan Africa generally contained the following pigment sources: Red was achieved by adding small amounts of metallic copper. The presence of Iron could also produce a red colour, as well as form green and brown tones.3  When copper was present and cooled in an oxidizing atmosphere (i.e. great exposure to oxygen) glass could achieve a blue-green colour. To get a clear blue colour cobalt was often used.3 To produce a purple colour manganese was added, and in the right environments manganese was also used as a decolouring agent. Yellow and opaque white were created by the addition of antimony and lead or tin and lead and if a stronger orange colour was desired zinc was then added as well. While the colouring of imported glass certainly took place in local Sub-Saharan beadworking sites, this does not imply that the minerals utilized came from local sources. Many glass pigments were most likely imported from abroad to Sub-Saharan beadworking sites.3

Beadworking sites
Archaeological evidence, coupled with historical documentation and oral tradition provide evidence of numerous Sub-Saharan beadmaking sites. Found Nupe beads from Nigeria suggest native individuals produced beads from scrap glass and bottles. Remains from the Ashanti region in Ghana imply beadmaking from moulds using imported powdered glass. Sites such as Gao, Mali and Igbo-Ukwu, Nigeria provide evidence for the production of Carnelian Bead. It is not known whether the Carnelian was a local material; however, bead production has been confirmed due to the discovery of lumps of imported raw glass and other glassworking equipment.5 Mapungbwe, South Africa provides another example of beadmaking. This site dates between 600-1200AD and contains evidence of glass working from pulverized bottles, ingots and other beads.

Primary production evidence
The most conclusive archaeological evidence for the primary production of glass in Sub-Saharan Africa comes from Ile-Ife, Nigeria, though finds in Gao, Mali, Benin and Ghana also support such inferences.4 Crucibles with glass layering and exterior vitrification indicative of production from raw materials prompted further compositional analysis. Archaeologist concluded that the glass found in the crucibles of Ile-Ife had a uniquely high percentage of lime and alumina compounds,4 a glass formula known only to exist in Korea. Importation of glass from Korea can be ruled out as this area only produced small quantities of glass, supplies no evidence of glass bead production and mainly only experimented with glazing.4 European, Middle Eastern, Indian and Chinese origins for the glass found at Ile-Ife can also be excluded as none of these traditions produced glass high in both lime and alumina.4 It has been suggested that this unique high-lime, high alumina glass could represent an entirely new glass making technology6 in which the alkali (soda) and alumina were derived from separate mineral sources. The lime source would also have been added separately; most probably in the form of limestone, marble or shell.6 These proposed sources for lime, native to Nigeria and other Sub-Saharan regions, comprise a novel yet plausible primary production process. Neighbouring areas, such as the sites at Ita Yemoo and Igbo-Ukwu, contain glass working evidence such as crucibles, cullets, and beads, all with high-lime, high-alumina glass compositions suggesting the secondary production of glass imported from Ile-Ife.4 Whether primary production technology was learned and transferred from abroad or locally invented is unknown. Most reasonably, the presence of imported glass beads pre-existed primary production technology which was later developed through processes of trial and error.4 6 The invention of glass distinctive to Sub-Saharan Africa could have been spurred due to a shortage of imported glass beads as material accessibility and supply often directed the course of glass production technology throughout the course of history (See History of Glass).

References

Bibliography
 Carey, Margret, 2003. Powder-Glass Beads in Africa. In: Ian C. Glover, Helen Hughes Brock ad Julian Henderson (ed.), Ornaments from the Past: Bead Studies After Beck. London: Bead Study Trust, 108–114.
 Davidson, Claire C., 1972. Glass Beads in African Archaeology: Results of Neutron Activation Analysis, Supplemented by Results of x-Ray Fluorescence Analysis. Unpublished Ph.D. thesis, University of California, Berkeley.
 Dubin, Lois Sherr, 1987. The History of Beads from 30,000 B.C. to the Present. London: Thames and Hudson.
 
 Engle Anita, 1990. The Ubiquitous Trade Bead, Readings in Glass History No. 22. Jerusalem: Phoenix Publication.
 
 Insoll, Timothy, 1996. Islam, Archaeology and History: Gao Region (Mali) ca. AD 900-1250. Oxford: Tempvs Reparavm.
 
Olasope, Olakunbi, 2009. Roman Jewellries, Benin Beads for Class Structures: Significance of Adornment in Ancient Cultures. Ibadan: Hope Library of Liberal Arts Series 
 Rehren, T., 2010. African and Chinese Beads. [Lecture] (Personal Communication, 11 November 2010).

External links
 The Victoria and Albert Museum 

History of glass
Sub-Saharan Africa
Economic history of Africa